Vaughn House may refer to:

Vaughn House (Little Rock, Arkansas), listed on the National Register of Historic Places (NRHP) in Little Rock, Arkansas]
Iredell P. Vaughn House, Eutaw, Alabama, listed on the National Register of Historic Places (NRHP)
Robert Vaughn Homestead, Vaughn, Montana, listed on the NRHP in Montana
Richard Vaughn Farm, Brecksville, Ohio, listed on the NRHP in Ohio
Daniel Vaughn Homestead, Lake Milton, Ohio, listed on the NRHP in Ohio
Andrew C. Vaughn House, Franklin, Tennessee, NRHP-listed

See also
Vaughan House (disambiguation)